Philosophia (minor planet designation: 227 Philosophia) is a large main-belt asteroid that was discovered by the French astronomer Paul-Pierre Henry on August 12, 1882, in Paris and named after the topic of philosophy. Based upon photometric observations, it has a synodic rotation period of 52.98 ± 0.01 with a brightness variation of 0.15 ± 0.02 in  magnitude.

References

External links 
 The Asteroid Orbital Elements Database
 Minor Planet Discovery Circumstances
 
 

Background asteroids
Philosophia
Philosophia
18820812